The Mayor of Durham is the chief executive of the government of the city of Durham, North Carolina. The current mayor is Elaine O'Neal, who assumed office in 2021.

The first mayor of Durham was tobacco merchant J. W. Cheek who was elected in 1869, although the position was originally known as "magistrate of police" up until 1871, when the title was changed to "mayor" during the tenure of W. J. H. Durham. Mayoral elections were held yearly until 1895, when they were changed to be held every other year.

External links 
 Mangum's directory of Durham and suburbs [serial] : including East Durham, West Durham, North Durham, Trinity College, Brookstown, and Hayti : with valuable historical data : illustrated

References 

 
Durham, North Carolina